The Matalag River is a river in the Philippines flowing from the town of Kabugao in Apayao province to Rizal town in Cagayan province. It is a tributary of the Chico River, which later joins the Cagayan River, the longest river in the country. The Isneg people settled within its area.

References

Rivers of the Philippines
Landforms of Apayao
Landforms of Cagayan